A table of the members of the Delaware General Assembly from New Castle County and the Governors.

Delaware senators under the Constitution of 1776
During this period the Upper House of the Delaware General Assembly was known as the Legislative Council and its members were Legislative Councillors. The terms "Senate" and "Senator" came into use with the adoption of the U.S. Constitution of 1787. Legislative Councillors were not the same as and should not to be confused with Privy Councillors, the persons serving on the Delaware Privy Council.

From 1776 to 1792 elections were held on the first day of October of the year noted. Terms for members of the General Assembly began on the twentieth day of October in the same year. If either date fell on a Sunday, the following day was prescribed. They met three times each year, generally in October, February and May. Members of the House of Assembly had a term of one year and members of the Legislative Council had a term of three years. Three State Councilmen and seven State Assemblymen were elected, at large, from each county.

The alternating grey and white boxes indicate the duration of the actual three year Council terms.

Delaware senators under the Constitution of 1792
The State Senate had a term of three years. Three state senators were elected, at large, from each county.

The alternating grey and white boxes indicate the duration of the actual three year Senate terms.

Delaware senators under the Constitution of 1831
The State Senate had a term of four years. Three state senators were elected, at large, from each county.

The alternating grey and white boxes indicate the duration of the actual four year Senate terms.

Delaware senators under the Constitution of 1897 before the 1965 reapportionment

The alternating grey and white boxes indicate the duration of the actual four year Senate terms.

References

Martin, Roger A. (1995). Memoirs of the Senate.

New Castle County, Delaware